Early American Literature is a peer-reviewed academic journal published three times a year by the University of North Carolina Press, focusing on the study of American literature before 1830, including Native American and French, British, Dutch, German, and Spanish colonial writing. It was established in 1965 and is currently edited by Marion Rust. It is the official publication of the Society of Early Americanists.

References

External links 

Publications established in 1965
Literary magazines published in the United States
English-language journals